Catenohalorites is an extinct genus of Triassic ammonoids belonging to the family Haloritidae.

Species
 Catenohalorites alexandri Mojsisovics 1893 †
 Catenohalorites catenatus von Buch 1833 †
 Catenohalorites malayicus Welter 1914 †

Fossil record
This genus is known in the fossil record of the Triassic (from about 212 to 205.6 million years ago). Fossils of species within this genus have been found in Indonesia, Oman and Tajikistan.

Bibliography
 Treatise on Invertebrate Paleontology, Part L, Ammonoidea. R. C. Moore (ed). Geological Society of America and Univ of Kansas press, 1957

See also
 List of ammonite genera

References

External links
 WMSD

Haloritidae
Ceratitida genera